There are at least 16 named mountains in Fallon County, Montana.
 Antelope Butte, el. 
 Bearhorn Butte, el. 
 Bracket Butte, el. 
 Cap Rock, el. 
 Cedar Butte, el. 
 Grassy Butte, el. 
 Harmon Butte, el. 
 Haystack Butte, el. 
 Monument Butte, el. 
 Morris Butte, el. 
 Nelson Butte, el. 
 Rocking Chair Butte, el. 
 Seven-up Butte, el. 
 Shell Butte, el. 
 Snider Hill, el. 
 Twin Buttes, el.

See also
 List of mountains in Montana
 List of mountain ranges in Montana

Notes

Fallon